is a Japanese football player. He plays for Matsue City FC.

Playing career
Taishi Sunagawa played for FC Ryukyu from 2012 to 2014. In 2015, he moved to Matsue City FC.

References

External links

1990 births
Living people
Komazawa University alumni
Association football people from Okinawa Prefecture
Japanese footballers
J3 League players
Japan Football League players
FC Ryukyu players
Association football defenders